Seymour L. "Sy" Studley (May, 1841 – July 9, 1901), nicknamed "Warhorse", also known as "Seem" Studley, was an American professional baseball player who played five games in center field for the  Washington Nationals of the National Association of Professional Base Ball Players. He collected two hits in 21 at bats for a career .095 batting average.

Born in Byron, New York in May 1841, he hailed from Rochester, New York when he joined the Washington Nationals of the NABBP in 1866.  He continued to play for the Nationals from 1867 to 1870.

Before his baseball career, Studley served for the 54th New York National Guard for a period of 100 days in 1864 during the American Civil War.  He died in Grand Island, Nebraska at the age of 60, and is interred at Soldiers and Sailors Home Cemetery.

References

Selected works
Ryczek, William J. 1998. When Johnny Came Sliding Home. McFarland. .

External links

1841 births
1901 deaths
19th-century baseball players
Major League Baseball center fielders
Washington Nationals (NABBP) players
Washington Nationals (NA) players
Sportspeople from Rochester, New York
Baseball players from New York (state)
People from Byron, New York